Meaty Beaty Big and Bouncy is a compilation album of singles by British rock band The Who, released in 1971 as Track 2406 006 in the UK and as Decca DL 79184 in the US. It entered the US Billboard 200 chart on 20 November 1971, peaking at number 11, and the UK chart on 3 December 1971, peaking at number 9.

Construction
Meaty Beaty Big and Bouncy was compiled by Pete Townshend. The band's manager Kit Lambert attempted to have the track order changed but failed because too many copies had already been pressed. The UK release was held up because The Who and Bill Curbishley had failed to clear it with Lambert.

The album is named after the members of the band: "Meaty" is Daltrey, who was quite fit at the time; "Beaty" is Moon, for his drumming; "Big" is Entwistle, who was a large person, often referred to as "The Ox" (lending his nickname to the instrumental of the same name); and "Bouncy" was Townshend, who jumped about quite acrobatically during performances.

The album's original title was The Who Looks Back. Most of the tracks on this album would also appear on many subsequent compilations of Who material.

Song notes
Several songs on the album had previously been released on studio albums. The Who's debut My Generation included the tracks "A Legal Matter" and "The Kids Are Alright"; A Quick One included "Boris the Spider", the one song written by John Entwistle, and in its American configuration "Happy Jack." "I Can See for Miles" appeared on The Who Sell Out, and "Pinball Wizard" on Tommy. "Pictures of Lily" and "Magic Bus" previously appeared on the US compilation album Magic Bus: The Who on Tour.  

Aside from two songs, "Boris the Spider" and "I'm a Boy", every track on the album had been released as a single in the UK; further, all except "A Legal Matter", "Magic Bus", and "The Seeker" were top ten hits. "Happy Jack", "I Can See for Miles", "Magic Bus", and "Pinball Wizard" had also been Top 40 hits in the US. "I'm a Boy" is represented by an alternate longer and slower version that was recorded 3 months after the original single release.

Releases
The original vinyl album featured a longer alternative studio take of "Magic Bus" in fake stereo which was not included on the original compact disc version, because the true stereo or mono source could not be found for the long version of the song. This longer take appeared on The Who Collection compilation in 1988.

On 25 July 2007, Universal Japan re-released Meaty Beaty Big and Bouncy in a mini-LP sleeve that included the long alternative version of "Magic Bus" in fake stereo, as with the original album.

In 2017, Polydor Records issued a remastered 180 gram vinyl LP of Meaty Beaty Big and Bouncy using Half Speed Mastering techniques. This edition includes the same mixes of the songs found on the original 1971 issue.

Artwork and photographs
On the front cover the Who are looking at four children, one of whom is Who manager Bill Curbishley's younger brother Paul.

The panoramic photograph featured on the inside cover of the gatefold vinyl packaging is an exterior shot of the side of the Railway Hotel, a pub that was sited on the bridge next to Harrow & Wealdstone station in north-west London. The Railway Hotel was a popular hangout for Mods and soon after Keith Moon joined the band, the Who became a regular attraction there from June 1964, performing every Tuesday night. It was here that Kit Lambert, their manager, first saw the band, and here that Pete Townshend accidentally cracked his guitar's neck on the low ceiling above the stage. In response to laughter from the crowd, he then smashed his guitar for the first time in public; a gimmick he maintained for many years when playing live. The band were filmed at the venue on 11 August – a copy of the recording turning up in 2002.

The Railway Hotel was destroyed by fire in March 2000, after becoming empty and vandalised. The site is now occupied by blocks of flats where the buildings, such as Moon House and Daltrey House, are named after the band members.

Critical reception 
Robert Christgau remarked that "In England, this is a greatest hits album [but] in the U.S., where some of these songs have never been released and most have never made the charts, it's a mishmash revelation". Dave Marsh, however, greeted the collection as a disappointment for true fans because Townshend had publicly promised a rich, surprising, and comprehensive collection. Noting that less than half the tracks were new to the U.S. in any way, Marsh wrote somewhat bitterly on the predictable "greatest hits" nature of the tracklist: "Meaty Beaty isn't half what it pretends to be, nor is it anywhere near what it COULD have been. It's not the album we dreamed about, Peter, but since there's so much other stuff lying around unissued, do you think you could try it again?" At the time there were many rarities in the Who catalog – B-sides, demos, and other tracks that were UK-only, live, or previously unreleased – and Marsh complained, "Why reissue things for the second (third) time on an album when you have such an incredible backlog of material?"

 In 1987, Rolling Stone ranked it number 99 on their list of the 100 best albums of the period 1967–1987.

Track listing

Personnel

The Who
 Roger Daltrey – lead vocals
 Pete Townshend – guitar, keyboards, backing and lead vocals
 John Entwistle – bass, backing and lead vocals
 Keith Moon – drums

Additional personnel
 Nicky Hopkins – piano on "Anyway, Anyhow, Anywhere", "A Legal Matter" and "The Seeker"
 Jimmy Page – 12-string rhythm guitar on "I Can't Explain" 
 Kit Lambert, Shel Talmy – production
 Bill Curbishley, Mike Shaw – album design
 Graham Hughes – photography
 Steve Hoffman – compact disc mastering

Charts

Certifications

References

External links
 Meaty Beaty Big & Bouncy liner notes - Song-by-song liner notes for the album
 

1971 greatest hits albums
Albums produced by Kit Lambert
Albums produced by Shel Talmy
The Who compilation albums
Decca Records compilation albums
MCA Records compilation albums
Polydor Records compilation albums
Track Records compilation albums
Albums produced by Pete Townshend
Albums produced by John Entwistle
Albums produced by Keith Moon
Albums produced by Roger Daltrey